Kireç Köyü is a town in Turkey. It is located south of Göksun, and surrounded by mountains.

References 

Towns in Turkey